Soltan Gah (also Romanized as Solţān Gah and Solţāngah) is a village in Abbas-e Gharbi Rural District, Tekmeh Dash District, Bostanabad County, East Azerbaijan Province, Iran. At the 2006 census, its population was 407, in 77 families.

References 

Populated places in Bostanabad County